Cello Aviation was a British private charter airline headquartered at Birmingham Airport. It was established as Altavia Jet Services in 2009 and was renamed Cello Aviation in July 2010 starting operations upon receiving Type A OL and AOC from the UK CAA.

History
Cello Aviation commenced operations with a purchased and refurbished BAe 146–200 aircraft fitted with 46 all business class seats, registration G-RAJJ. On 12 October 2018, Cello Aviation announced it had ceased trading with immediate effect. The airline had seen losses amounting to as much as £302,000 prior to March 2017 and £961,000 during the previous year. Cello Aviation could not obtain additional funding and filed for bankruptcy in October 2018, ceasing all trading with immediate effect. All contracts the airline had were axed.

Operations
The airline primarily operated private and VIP charters with two specially configured aircraft. It also operated wet lease and full charter flights with two Boeing 737 and an Avro RJ100 aircraft. The airline's passengers have included Queen Elizabeth II, who flew to Dublin as part of her 2011 visit to the Republic of Ireland.

Fleet

As of February 2018, the Cello Aviation fleet consisted of the following aircraft:

Former fleet

Previously, Cello Aviation also operated the following aircraft:

See also
 List of defunct airlines of the United Kingdom

References

Defunct airlines of the United Kingdom
Airlines established in 2009
Airlines disestablished in 2018
Defunct charter airlines